Awan Besar LRT station is a Light Rapid Transit station at Bukit OUG, Kuala Lumpur, Malaysia.

It is operated under the Sri Petaling Line. Like most other LRT stations operating in Klang Valley, this station is elevated.

Awan Besar station is also the nearest station to the Masonic Temple or locally known as the Freemason Hall and Bukit OUG Condominium. There is a free shuttle bus between Pavilion Bukit Jalil and the station with 30 minute bus intervals since 3 December 2021.

Awan Besar LRT station is located after the Sri Petaling station, the former terminus of the Sri Petaling branch line of the Ampang Line.

References

External links 
 Awan Besar LRT Station - KL MRT Line Integrations
 Awan Besar Station Google Maps

Ampang Line
Railway stations opened in 2015
Rapid transit stations in Kuala Lumpur